Pseudonocardia aurantiaca is a Gram-positive and aerobic bacterium from the genus of Pseudonocardia which has been isolated from soil from Jianchuan in China.

References

Pseudonocardia
Bacteria described in 1999